The City of Miami was a seven-car coach streamliner inaugurated by Illinois Central Railroad on December 18, 1940.

History 
The City of Miami was one of three new all-coach streamliners which, together, provided daily service between Chicago and Florida. The other two streamliners were the South Wind and the Dixie Flagler, each of which followed a different route. As with the other routes it was managed by a consortium of train companies, as different engines switched as the coaches and sleepers traveled over different companies' tracks.

The City of Miami was powered by a single EMD E6A  diesel passenger cab unit. The entire train was painted in an Orange and Palm Green scheme with Scarlet stripes and lettering. Up to and including this new train the Illinois Central seemed to have difficulty deciding on a paint scheme for their streamlined trains. The Green Diamond, Illini, Miss Lou, and now the City of Miami were all painted in their own distinct paint schemes.

Illinois Central was the key player in the City's long run from 1940 to 1971. Immaculately maintained equipment and perfectly matched consists in IC's familiar "Autumn Sunset" chocolate, orange, and yellow were traditional hallmarks of the ever popular Florida streamliner. Indeed, the City was a beautiful sight racing through the countryside between Lake Michigan and Biscayne Bay. During the peak winter season long trains carried several lounges and diners in addition to a sleeper lounge and tavern lounge observation on the rear. Domes were added in 1959. Courier Nurses were replaced by Passenger Service Representatives in later years, but a high standard of service was maintained right up to May 1, 1971, when Amtrak took over and dropped the City of Miami and reinstated the South Wind on the Chicago-Florida route. That year, Amtrak initiated the Floridian on a route largely similar to that of the South Wind.

Route 

The City of Miami ran from Chicago to Miami by way of Champaign, Centralia, Fulton, Jackson, Birmingham, Columbus, Waycross, and Jacksonville. Between Chicago and Birmingham the streamliner scorched IC rails. Leaving Birmingham the train traversed the Central of Georgia Railway to Albany, Georgia. From Albany to Jacksonville the Atlantic Coast Line Railroad (Seaboard Coast Line Railroad from July 1967) was used. The Florida East Coast Railroad operated the train from Jacksonville to Miami until the FEC strike of 1963. By 1955 the West Coast Champion began hauling thru-cars for the City of Miami and South Wind streamliners to and from Chicago on its Jacksonville-Tampa/Sarasota leg via Orlando and its Jacksonville-St. Petersburg section via Gainesville and Ocala.  After the 1963 FEC strike the City of Miami and all ACL Miami-bound trains were rerouted through Orlando via ACL to Auburndale where they crossed over to SAL (SCL) rails to reach West Palm Beach and Miami. The SCL continued a section through Gainesville to St. Petersburg and a Sarasota section through Tampa. The St. Petersburg and Miami sections were split and joined at Jacksonville until Amtrak arrived on May 1, 1971.

The only engine change to occur on this route was at Jacksonville where the IC E6A 4000 was exchanged for the FEC's EMC E3 1001 to Miami. The City of Miami was the only one of the three Chicago to Miami lightweight streamlined trains to operate with diesel power over the entire route from the beginning. In spite of the number of stops the diesel proved more than capable of maintaining a  average. The City of Miami consist was the only one of the three Chicago – Miami lightweight streamlined trains to operate with cars built by Pullman Standard and the only one of the three trains to be diesel powered end terminal to end terminal.

Timetable
{| class="wikitable"
! City
! Departure time
|-
|Chicago, Illinois (Central Station) (Illinois Central) (C.T.)
|8:40 a.m.
|-
|Chicago, Illinois (53rd Street)
|8:47 a.m.
|-
|Chicago, Illinois (63rd Street)
|8:50 a.m.
|-
|Kankakee, Illinois
|9:37 a.m.
|-
|Champaign–Urbana, Illinois
|10:45 a.m.
|-
|Mattoon, Illinois
|11:22 a.m.
|-
|Effingham, Illinois
|11:47 a.m.
|-
|Centralia, Illinois
|12:45 p.m.
|-
|Carbondale, Illinois
|1:35 p.m.
|-
|North Cairo, Illinois
|2:45 p.m.
|-
|Fulton, Kentucky
|3:38 p.m.
|-
|Jackson, Tennessee
|4:55 p.m.
|-
|Corinth, Mississippi
|6:03 p.m.
|-
|Haleyville, Alabama
|7:28 p.m.
|-
|Jasper, Alabama
|8:50 p.m.
|-
|Birmingham, Alabama (Central of Georgia)
|10:17 p.m.
|-
|Sylacauga, Alabama
|11:39 p.m.
|-
|Opelika, Alabama
|1:06 a.m.
|-
|Columbus, Georgia
|1:43 a.m.
|-
|Albany, Georgia (Atlantic Coast Line)
|3:40 a.m.
|-
|Waycross, Georgia (E.T.)
|7:00 a.m.
|-
|Jacksonville, Florida (Florida East Coast)
|8:30 a.m.
|-
|St. Augustine, Florida
|9:15 a.m.
|-
|Bunnell, Florida
|9:38 a.m.
|-
|Daytona Beach, Florida
|10:02 a.m.
|-
|New Smyrna Beach, Florida
|10:25 a.m.
|-
|Titusville, Florida
|10:54 a.m.
|-
|Cocoa-Rockledge, Florida
|11:11 a.m.
|-
|Melbourne, Florida
|11:30 a.m.
|-
|Vero Beach, Florida
|12:02 p.m.
|-
|Fort Pierce, Florida
|12:21 p.m.
|-
|Stuart, Florida
|12:41 p.m.
|-
|Hobe Sound, Florida
|12:54 p.m.
|-
|West Palm Beach, Florida
|1:21 p.m.
|-
|Lake Worth, Florida
|1:33 p.m.
|-
|Delray Beach, Florida
|1:45 p.m.
|-
|Boca Raton, Florida
|1:54 p.m.
|-
|Pompano, Florida
|2:01 p.m.
|-
|Fort Lauderdale, Florida
|2:12 p.m.
|-
|Hollywood, Florida
|2:24 p.m.
|-
|Miami, Florida
|2:50 p.m.
|-
|colspan=2|<small>Source: Official Guide of the Railways, June 1941</small>
|}

 Equipment 

At the outset a single Illinois Central EMD E6 pulled the train for the entire route. Pullman built the initial equipment set of the City of Miami; Budd manufactured the other two sets. The original seven-car set included the following:Bougainvillea baggage-dormitoryCamellia coach with nurse's stationJaponica coachHibiscus coachPoinsettia coachPalm Garden dining carBamboo Grove tavern-lounge observation car

Beginning April 23, 1949 the City of Miami added sleeping cars to its consist. These cars were carried forward of the coaches in the City of Miami'' consist maintaining quick access for coach passengers to the tavern-observation-lounge car on the rear. By 1958 the "colored" coach had been removed from the consist.

Notes

References

External links 
 
 City of Miami - June, 1941 - Timetable at Streamliner Schedules
 City of Miami - April, 1971 - Timetable at Streamliner Schedules

Named passenger trains of the United States
Passenger trains of the Atlantic Coast Line Railroad
Passenger trains of the Illinois Central Railroad
Passenger trains of the Seaboard Coast Line Railroad
Railway services introduced in 1940
1971 disestablishments in the United States
Night trains of the United States
Railway services discontinued in 1971
Passenger rail transportation in Illinois
Passenger rail transportation in Kentucky
Passenger rail transportation in Tennessee
Passenger rail transportation in Mississippi
Passenger rail transportation in Alabama
Passenger rail transportation in Georgia (U.S. state)
Passenger rail transportation in Florida